Véronique was a French liquid-fuelled sounding rocket of the 1950s. It was the first liquid-fuel research rocket in Western Europe.

Véronique was a French-led project that had its roots in the German V-2 rocket, and was partially developed by German scientists who had worked in Peenemünde. It was a successor to the cancelled Super V-2, the Véronique was built between 1950 and 1969 in several versions, of which the versions P2, P6 and R were only experimental models. They were made in Vernon, Eure. The name Veronique is a portmanteau of Vernon-électronique, and is also a common French first name.

On 20 February 1959, the first Véronique launch was performed, although it was recorded as a failure. The last Veronique-61 was launched on 31 May 1974. The programme was eclipsed by new rockets, such as the wholly indigenous Diamant launcher.

History

Background
In the immediate aftermath of the Second World War, various nations were keen to incorporate recent military advances into their own armed forces; the newly liberated nation of France was no exception. Akin to the American's Operation Paperclip, France recruited various scientists and skilled personnel from the former Axis countries, particularly those with knowledge of advanced aerospace technologies. Amongst these were in excess of 30 staff that had formerly worked at Peenemünde, the hub of the Nazi German rocket programme that produced the V-2 rocket.

During mid-1946, France embarked on development of a V-2 derivative, popularly referred to as the Super V-2. This programme involved two distinct phases, the first being the establishment of appropriate facilities to produce V-2 components – this was partially achieved via the acquisition of most of the components for roughly 30 V-2s, either from subcontractors in France or sourced from the French zone of occupation in Germany. Surveys for a suitable launch facility in Algeria were also conducted, opting for a site near Colomb-Bechar.

However, major problems with the Super V-2 programme had become clear by early 1947.  France's allies were unwilling to supply V-2 components, yet establishing a completely independent production of all components in France was estimated to take at least five years, by which point the Super V-2 was expected to have become obsolete. Thus, it was decided that two separate programmes would be pursued; in addition to work on the Super V-2, a purely French derivative, initially referred to as project 4212, would be designed by a separate team. During 1948, the Super V-2 project was abandoned in favour other efforts, cumulating in project 4213, a one-tenth scale rocket that was given the name Veronique, a portmanteau of VERnon et electrONIQUE.

During March 1949, work formally commenced on Veronique. The project had the primary objective of delivering a flight test vehicle for liquid rocket engine development; a secondary purpose was the launching of scientific payloads at high altitudes. Principal responsibility for manufacturing was held by the Laboratoire de recherches balistiques et aérodynamiques (LRBA).

Into flight
Partial system tests were conducted as early as 1951. However, it was not until May 1952 that the first full-scale Véronique-N (Véronique Normal) was launched. It was powered by a single liquid-fuelled rocket motor that weighed four tonnes; its fuel was a combination of kerosene and nitric acid. Veronique employed a unique wire-guidance system that used four 55 m cables attached to its fins immediately upon launch. Initially, the rocket motor suffered from combustion instability, which became a leading cause of early launch failures; furthermore, the maximum altitude of 65 km was found to be insufficient for many scientific purposes.

Accordingly, it was decided to undertake a lengthy development programme throughout the 1950s which produced numerous other models were produced for specific purposes. The Véronique AGL was developed as a sounding rocket, a total of 15 such rockets were constructed using subsidies provided by the French National Defense Scientific Action Committee. This model was largely similar to the Véronique-N, had had a reduced empty weight, and a simplified engine that used turpentine fuel in place of kerosene. A lengthened model, the Véronique NA, enabled an altitude of 135 km to be reached; it also features a modified engine injector that had greater stability. A pair of Véronique P2 test vehicles were produced to experiment with the wire-guidance system.

The definitive version was the Veronique-61, which featured substantial improvements such as a 50% increase in thrust. It was a far larger rocket, capable of carrying a 60 kg payload to an altitude of 315 km. A lengthened version, the Veronique-61M, was also produced, suitable for carrying payloads of up to 100 kg. On 8 June 1964, the first was launched; the last Veronique-61 was launched on 31 May 1974. Of the 21 launches performed, 20 were considered to be failures to varying degrees.

Amongst the tests in aid of scientific research that were conducted using the rocket were a series of biological experiments involving live animals. On account of the available payload capacity and thrust output available via Véronique, the use of larger animals was not possible, thus rats and cats were used; these were carried within a sealed container within the rocket's nose cone which was designed to be retrievable and for the return of its occupant alive. One consequence of these flights was the only recorded launch of a cat into space.

By 1965, the Véronique had begun to be eclipsed by a newer rocket, which was also entirely indigenously designed, the Diamant expendable launch system.

See also 
 Aggregat 8
 French space program

References

Citations

Bibliography
 
 

Sounding rockets of France
Weapons and ammunition introduced in 1950
1950 in military history